The Lion, the Witch and the Wardrobe is an American dramatization of The Lion, the Witch and the Wardrobe by C.S. Lewis, the 1950 British children's novel that inaugurated The Chronicles of Narnia. The one-act play for two actors was written by Le Clanché du Rand and published in 1989 by Dramatic Publishing of Woodstock, Illinois. It is licensed by Dramatic to theaters worldwide. One production opened in 2011 Off-Broadway in New York City.

Notable productions
The play is currently running Off-Broadway at St. Luke's Theatre in New York City.  The production is directed by Julia Beardsley O'Brien and stage managed by Lila Neiswanger.  The current cast features Rockford Sansom and Abigail Taylor-Sansom.

2013: Marin Theatre Company in Mill Valley, CA, presented a production directed by Jessa Berkner and featuring Reggie White and Elena Wright.

2014: South Carolina Children's Theater in Greenville, SC, listed the show as part of their touring roster for the 2014-2015 season.

2016: Dramatization by Adrian Mitchell for the Stratford Festival, directed by Tim Carroll.

References

External links

The Lion, the Witch and the Wardrobe Off-Broadway (narniaoffbroadway.com)
 
 

play, Lion
Plays based on novels
1989 plays